Queensland State Hockey Centre is a multi-purpose stadium in Brisbane, Australia.  It is currently used for field hockey and is home to the Brisbane Blaze who play in Hockey One.

Facilities
The Queensland State Hockey Centre includes two international standard water based synthetic hockey fields with international standard lighting. There is a covered grandstand, an electronic scoreboard, multiple change rooms, multiple large grass playing fields with lighting, a first-aid room. Other facilities include a hockey pro-shop, a covered courtyard with seating, an external sound system and canteen facilities.

See also
Sport in Brisbane

References

Field hockey venues in Australia
Sports venues in Brisbane
Multi-purpose stadiums in Australia